İstanbul Maltepespor, often known as just Maltepespor, is a Turkish football club from the Istanbul district of Maltepe, Istanbul.

References

External links
 Official website
 Maltepespor on TFF.org

 
Sport in Istanbul
Football clubs in Turkey
Association football clubs established in 1923
1923 establishments in Turkey